The Information Systems Professional (I.S.P), or Informaticien professionnel agréé (I.P.A. in French), is a professional designation issued by the Canadian Information Processing Society (CIPS).  Introduced in 1989, the professional designation is recognised by legislation in most provinces of Canada.  Before meeting the entry requirements for professional status an applicant may use the "Candidate Member I.S.P" designation.

CIPS has developed the Computer Science Accreditation Council (CSAC), and the Information Systems and Technology Accreditation Council (ISTAC) to accredit baccalaureate programs in Computer Science, Software Engineering, Management Information Systems, Computer Systems Technology, Applied Information Technology, and post-diploma type programs in Canada.  These accredited programs combined with several years of experience lead to the I.S.P. designation.

See also
 Fédération de l'informatique du Québec

External links
 CIPS

Legislation
 Alberta:  Professional and Occupational Associations Registration Act, R.S.A. 2000, c. P-26, Information Systems Professional Regulation, Alta. Reg. 39/1997
 British Columbia: Society Act, R.S.B.C. 1996, s.s. 86-93 (Occupational Titles Protection)
 New Brunswick: Canadian Information Processing Society of New Brunswick Act, 2001, c. 49
 Nova Scotia: Canadian Information Processing Society of Nova Scotia Act, S.N.S. 2002, c. 3
 Ontario: An Act respecting Canadian Information Processing Society of Ontario, 1998, c. Pr5
 Saskatchewan: Canadian Information Processing Society of Saskatchewan Act, S.S. 2005, c. C-0.2

Computer science education
Information technology qualifications